The Tournament in Łukasz Romanek Memory is an annual motorcycle speedway event held each year organized by the RKM Rybnik. The Tournament held in the Municipal Stadium in Rybnik, Poland. It is named after Łukasz Romanek (1983–2006), a speedway rider who won the 2001 Individual Under-19 European Champion and 2003 Individual Under-21 Polish Champion titles. Romanek hang oneself in June 2006.

Podium

See also 
 motorcycle speedway
 RKM Rybnik

References

External links 
  RKM.Rybnik.pl Official website

Romanek
Speedway
Sport in Silesian Voivodeship